Hoshihananomia pseudohananomi is a species of beetle in the genus Hoshihananomia of the family Mordellidae, which is part of the superfamily Tenebrionoidea. It was discovered in 1993.

References

Beetles described in 1993
Mordellidae